The siege of Coimbatore was a siege conducted by forces of the Kingdom of Mysore against a garrison of British East India Company and Travancore troops holding the fortress at Coimbatore in southern India during the Third Anglo-Mysore War.  The siege began in May 1791, and several men trying to storm the fort were repulsed on 11 June, after which the garrison of Lieutenant John Chalmers was reinforced, and a larger Mysorean force was brought against it.  The garrison eventually surrendered on 2 November.  Tipu Sultan broke the terms of the surrender, and held the garrison's commanding officers prisoner. John Chalmers was also held prisoner by Tipu Sultan and his forces. It is believed that around 100 British soldiers were executed in captivity by the Mysorean forces.

References

Mill, James. A history of British India, Volume 5

Coimbatore
Coimbatore 1791
Coimbatore 1791
Coimbatore 1791
1791 in India
Coimbatore
History of Coimbatore